Karl Hermann Friedrich Geiler (10 August 1878 – 14 September 1953) was a German lawyer and politician. He was born in Schönau (Baden) and died in Heidelberg.

Geiler, a university professor of economic law in Heidelberg and without affiliation to a political party at the time (during the Weimar Republic, he was a member of the German Democratic Party), was installed prime minister of the newly created territory Greater Hesse by the US military administration. He replaced the social democrate Ludwig Bergsträsser, who served as acting minister-president for only one month, and would remain in office until a successor could be democratically elected. His term, from 12 October 1945 to 20 December 1946, saw the first local elections after World War II in January 1946, the vote on the constitution of Hesse and the first election of the Landtag of Hesse in December 1946.

Geiler was fiercely opposed to denazification.

References 
 Karl Geiler becomes first prime minister of Greater Hesse (in German)

1878 births
1953 deaths
People from Schönau im Schwarzwald
People from the Grand Duchy of Baden
German Democratic Party politicians
Grand Crosses 1st class of the Order of Merit of the Federal Republic of Germany
Ministers-President of Hesse